Adam Bronikowski (born 11 March 1978 in Warsaw) is a Polish rower.

External links 
 
 
 
 
 

1978 births
Living people
Polish male rowers
Rowers from Warsaw
Rowers at the 2000 Summer Olympics
Rowers at the 2004 Summer Olympics
Olympic rowers of Poland
World Rowing Championships medalists for Poland